Frimpong is an Ashanti surname. Notable people with the Ashanti surname include:

 Abraham Frimpong (born 1993), Ghanaian footballer
 Emmanuel Frimpong (born 1992), Ghanaian footballer
 Eric Asamoah-Frimpong (born 1990), Ghanaian footballer
 Godfried Frimpong (born 1999), Dutch footballer
 Joetex Asamoah Frimpong (born 1982), Ghanaian footballer
 Jeremie Frimpong (born 2000), Dutch footballer
 K. Frimpong, Ghanaian singer
 Kwame Pele Frimpong (born 1983), Ghanaian footballer
 Tina Frimpong Ellertson (born 1982), American female footballer
 Yaw Frimpong (born 1986), Ghanaian footballer

See also

 Frempong

 Frimpong-Boateng, surgeon and politician
 Frimpong Manso, footballer
 Shirley Frimpong-Manso, film director

Surnames of Ashanti origin
Surnames of Akan origin